The Volcano was a nightclub in Glasgow that featured in the 1996 film Trainspotting.

Location 
The nightclub was located on 15 Benalder Street in Partick Cross, close to Kelvinhall subway station.

History 

The nightclub was previously known as Cinders Disco before being purchased by Colin Barr in 1989, who turned it into The Volcano.  The name was chosen in honour of Glaswegian disc-jockey Gordon Lyle who was murdered in a Florida carpark after working in La Volcanic nightclub owned by  Frank Lynch around the same time that Barr purchased the club. The low-budget interior of the club was designed by Ron McCulloch.

The building was demolished and remained vacant for some time before being used as a site to build housing.

Feature in Trainspotting 

The Volcano appears in a scene in Danny Boyle's 1996 Trainspotting, in the scene character Mark Renton meets schoolgirl Diane.

The suggestion to use the location to shoot the scene was made to Boyle by Bobby Paterson, the bass guitarist of Love and Money band.

See also 

 The Crosslands

References 

Nightclubs in Glasgow
Electronic dance music venues
1989 establishments in Scotland